The Walter V. Smith House is a house located in southwest Portland, Oregon listed on the National Register of Historic Places.

See also
 National Register of Historic Places listings in Southwest Portland, Oregon

References

1898 establishments in Oregon
Bungalow architecture in Oregon
Houses completed in 1898
Houses on the National Register of Historic Places in Portland, Oregon
Joseph Jacobberger buildings
Southwest Hills, Portland, Oregon
Portland Historic Landmarks